Brian Gavin (born 14 November 1957) is a fifth-generation diamond cutter from South Africa.  Referred to as "Brian the Cutter," Gavin is best known for establishing a quality benchmark and grading system for hearts and arrows diamonds, a specialized precision-cut form of the round brilliant diamond.

Hearts and arrows grading system
Renowned for strictness, Gavin's system for the grading of hearts and arrows diamonds was first presented at the 2004 International Diamond Cut Conference (IDCC) in Moscow Russia.  Available free of charge, his system is in-use by credentialed diamond appraisers and consumer-protection laboratories.

Family history
Brian is the son of Ben Gavin (1929–2009), master diamond cutter, and Femma Gavin, a well known South African artist featured in the Smithsonian Libraries’ Collection (1935–2006). He is the grandson of Esther Alida (Stella) Aronson (1915–1980) and Barend Deutz (1911–1987) master diamond cutter from the well known Deutz family in Amsterdam. In the late 1930s, Deutz was brought to South Africa to teach diamond cutting along with his brother-in-law, Solly Neuwit, at Majestic Diamond Cutting Works in Johannesburg. By the early 1950s, Majestic was made a DeBeers sightholder and continued to flourish into the 1980s.

Patents
With research starting in 2009, Gavin developed and patented a cushion cut diamond with hearts and arrows

References
Hearts and Arrows Grading 
Hearts & Arrows Intro from 2004 International Diamond Cut Conference (IDCC)
Hearts & Arrows Formation and Grading from 2004 International Diamond Cut Conference (IDCC)

External links
"The Accidental E-Tailer" from Houston Business Journal, 26 January 2007
Smithsonian Libraries’ Collections: Femma Gavin
International Diamond Cut Conference Overview

Diamond cutting
1957 births
Living people